Patrick Ray McGowan (born November 27, 1954) is an American professional golf instructor and former PGA Tour player.

McGowan was born in Grand Forks, North Dakota. He attended Brigham Young University. He played on the golf team with fellow PGA Tour player Mike Reid and graduated in 1977.

McGowan developed his game under the tutelage of Warren McCarty, head pro at Colusa Golf and Country Club, and Karl Tucker, golf coach at Brigham Young University. During more recent years, his game and career have been influenced by Peggy Kirk Bell, his mother-in-law and one of golf’s leading instructors, and David Orr, Head Teaching Professional at Pine Needles. McGowan qualified for the PGA Tour on his first attempt in the fall of 1977, playing at Pinehurst, where he met his wife, Bonnie, daughter of Peggy Kirk and late "Bullet" Bell. McGowan was named Golf Digest / Rolex Rookie-of-the-Year in 1978.

One highlight of McGowan's career came in the 1984 Sacramento Classic in the Tournament Players Series during which he defeated Steve Hart in a playoff. Other highlights include a 2nd-place finish in the 1978 Canadian Open to Bruce Lietzke. During the Quad Cities Open in 1982, he was tied for the lead after three rounds with Calvin Peete and Jeff Mitchell. A final round 67 left him tied for second behind Payne Stewart who finished with a 63. McGowan also finished second to Calvin Peete in the 1986 USF&G Classic, while his best finish in a major was 4th in the 1983 PGA Championship at Riviera Country Club.

Professional wins (2)
1980 Northern California Open
1984 Sacramento Classic

Playoff record
Other playoff record (0–1)

Results in major championships

Note: McGowen never played in The Open Championship.

CUT = missed the half-way cut
"T" = tied

See also 

 Fall 1977 PGA Tour Qualifying School graduates

External links

American male golfers
BYU Cougars men's golfers
PGA Tour golfers
PGA Tour Champions golfers
Golfers from North Dakota
Sportspeople from Grand Forks, North Dakota
1954 births
Living people